Úrsula Ruiz Pérez (born 11 August 1983 in Lorca, Región de Murcia) is a Spanish athlete.

Competition record

References

External links
 
 
 

Spanish female shot putters
Athletes (track and field) at the 2012 Summer Olympics
Olympic athletes of Spain
1983 births
Living people
World Athletics Championships athletes for Spain
Spanish Athletics Championships winners
Competitors at the 2009 Summer Universiade
Competitors at the 2011 Summer Universiade
People from Lorca, Spain
Sportspeople from the Region of Murcia